The City of Glen Eira is a local government area in Victoria, Australia. It is located in the south-eastern suburbs of Melbourne. It was formed in 1994 from the merger of the City of Caulfield and parts of the City of Moorabbin, and takes its name from two local landmarks—Glen Eira Road and Glen Eira Mansion.

Council

Glen Eira City Council is the third tier of government and deals with services such as garbage collection, building permits and approvals, roads, drainage, health services, food safety, parks and gardens, library services, pets, street parking permits and the collection of rates and charges. The Council meets at the Glen Eira Town Hall. Since 2004, the Council area has been divided into three wards (Camden, Rosstown and Tucker), each electing three Councilors. The most recent election took place on 23 October 2020. The current councillors are, in order of election:

Past Glen Eira councillors

Glen Eira officers
 List of Mayors of Glen Eira

Election results

2020 election results

Townships and localities
The 2021 census, the city had a population of 148,908 up from 140,875 in the 2016 census

^ - Territory divided with another LGA

Demographics

Ages
The median age for Glen Eira residents is 37 years. Children 0–14 years make up 18.0% of the population, 15 to 19 years 5.4%, 20 to 64 61.9% and those 65 years and over 14.7%.

Registered marital status
Of people in Glen Eira aged 15 years and over, 49.6% are married, 35.1% have never married and 9.1% are divorced or separated.

Country of birth
The country of birth for City of Glen Eira residents includes Australia 60.3%, India 3.8%, China 3.2%, England 2.8%, South Africa 2.3% and Greece 1.7%.

Religion
The City of Glen Eira includes a large Jewish community in Elsternwick, St Kilda East and Caulfield. At the 2011 Census 54.9% of all Victorians who gave Judaism as their religion were living in Glen Eira. The major responses were No Religion 22.9%, Catholicism 20.1%, Judaism 18.9%, Anglican 8.4% and Eastern Orthodox 6.6%.

History
This area was originally occupied by the Wurundjeri, Indigenous Australians of the Kulin nation, who spoke variations of the Woiwurrung language group.

Settlement
Victoria was proclaimed a separate colony in 1851.

East St Kilda commenced to be settled in the 1850s. The area of Glen Eira was once swamps, with farms in the northern area and market gardens in the south. Dirt tracks wound through the swamps and sandy heaths of the district. They were constantly damaged by farmers' cart wheels, creating dangerous holes and making access difficult.

In 1853 the Victorian Parliament passed an Act to give authority to locally elected people to extract rates from residents in order to finance road construction. Residents lobbied for a roads district to be proclaimed to ensure that roads were maintained and passable. Caulfield's organised communal existence began as a District Roads Board in 1857 and the first Caulfield Roads Board was elected in November 1857. It had control over the roads in an area bounded by Warrigal Road, Hotham Street, Dandenong Road, North Road and Brighton Road. The proclamation of the Caulfield Roads Board tied the name 'Caulfield' to a specific area.

Moorabbin became a Roads Board in 1862. The board's boundaries extended from the outskirts of Brighton and south-east along both sides of the Nepean Road as far as Mordialloc Creek, taking in the coastal areas now known as Hampton, Sandringham, Beaumaris and Mentone.

Caulfield became a Shire in 1871 and a City in 1913; Moorabbin became a Shire in 1874 and a City in 1934.

The first railway link to the area was at Caulfield and Carnegie railway stations, which opened in 1879, to be followed in 1881 by Glenhuntly and Ormond railway stations.

For the first 25 years of Caulfield's municipal life, board/shire members met in "Mood Kee", the house of Cr Harold Pennington. He was paid 10 pounds a year to cover the cost of candles, fuel and the room. The annual general meeting was held in a tent in the backyard. The Caulfield Town Hall (now the Glen Eira Town Hall) was built in 1885. The building was modified several times to meet the growing demands of the municipality, as was Moorabbin Town Hall.

Moorabbin, part of the earliest development of Melbourne, began as an outpost of "Dendy's Brighton" and took shape as a market garden area along what was Arthur's Seat Road, now the Nepean Highway. For more than a century, the sandy soil of Moorabbin provided metropolitan Melbourne with much of its fruit and vegetables.

After World War II, Moorabbin became one of the first 'boom suburbs'. By the 1950s, along with the Sydney suburb of Bankstown, it became the fastest growing municipality in Australia.

Road conditions were just one of the major challenges to face the elected bodies in a developing area. As the farms and market gardens gave way to housing and the district's population grew, street lighting (originally gas), drainage, sewerage, rubbish collection, tips and other services were provided.

Today, the City of Glen Eira is an established area. Glen Eira City Council is responsible for maintaining an ageing infrastructure and strives to update with works on roads, drains and footpaths.

Public health issues have always been a key part of Council's activities. A clean water supply and sanitary removal of sewage was critical last century because of outbreaks of disease, such as typhoid, diphtheria and scarlet fever. These functions have now been taken by Melbourne Water.

Council has for a long time had a role in controlling the impact of animals on health and well-being. Late last century, Caulfield Council was paying a reward for the heads of rats. Dog registration was instituted in 1865.

Social caring and support roles have continued to grow, from maternal and child health centres – the first opened around 1924 – to providing work for the unemployed during the Depression, digging trenches in Caulfield Park during World War II, setting up welfare funds and operating Meals on Wheels from 1957.

Immunisation services have been provided since the last century. Council libraries began in the district with the Bentleigh Library in July 1961; the Caulfield service followed in 1963.

Providing public open spaces has also been a long tradition. Paddy's Swamp (now Caulfield Park) was set aside as a reserve in the 1880s. Many other sites once used as tips were turned into parks and gardens. Some parks were provided partly to cater for the large crowds at municipal band performances. As involvement in sport developed, so did the reserves' facilities.

Evolution of the city

1857 Caulfield Road District
1862 Moorabbin Road District
1863 Shire of Caulfield
1874 Shire of Moorabbin    	
1913 City of Caulfield
1934 City of Moorabbin    	
1994 City of Glen Eira, by merger of Caulfield and north section of Moorabbin

Names

Caulfield

The origin of the name of Caulfield is uncertain, however the name seemed to be linked with Baron Caulfeild of Ireland, perhaps through John Caulfield, a pioneer of the colony.

The name 'Caulfield' was in use by 1853, and the early maps always place it somewhere around the racecourse. It was not in general use for the whole area until the proclamation of the Caulfield Road District in 1857.

Moorabbin

The name "Moorabbin" is derived from an Aboriginal word which principally means 'a resting place'. The proper name is probably 'moorooboon', a term used by the tribal group of the area, the Bunurong. The first European settlers may have found 'moorooboon' difficult to pronounce and accordingly corrupted the word for ease of use. The name Moorabbin applied from the earliest days of the Port Phillip settlement and remains today.

Glen Huntly

Glen Huntly is named after a ship, the Glen Huntly, that arrived in Port Phillip in 1840, after setting off from Greenock, Scotland. She was carrying 190 new immigrants, skilled manual labourers who were heading for the new colony settled in Melbourne.  Fever, most likely typhoid, struck the ship mid journey and only 50 people survived to reach Port Phillip Bay.  The Glen Huntly was forced to land at Little Red Bluff (now Point Ormond) and Victoria's first quarantine station was formed to deal with the crisis.  Supplies and provisions were brought down what is now Glen Huntly Road and the small town was formed.

Until recently Glen Huntly was spelt 'Glenhuntly'. The Council voted to change the spelling of the name of the suburb and of the road that bears the name to bring it to the historical spelling. However, the vote did not affect the spelling of the train station which continues to be spelt 'Glenhuntly'. The section of the Glen Huntly Road/Glenhuntly Road which comes within the boundaries of the City of Port Phillip continued for a time to be spelt 'Glenhuntly Road', but has now been changed to bring it into line with the rest of the road.

Bentleigh

One of Moorabbin's early identities was Thomas Bent, who was simultaneously a Councillor on both Moorabbin and Brighton Councils for more than 40 years, as well becoming a State Member of Parliament and Premier. The suburb of Bentleigh is named after him.

Carnegie

Carnegie was originally called Rosstown, after William Murray Ross, a developer. The name was changed to Carnegie in 1909 in an unsuccessful attempt to secure funds for a library from the philanthropist Andrew Carnegie. The original name lives on in the name of the local hotel, and Rosstown Road. Leila Road is named after Mr Ross's wife, and Grange Road is named after Ross' estate, The Grange, which has since been subdivided and is now suburban housing estates. Carnegie Primary School (No. 2897) was established in 1888 as Rosstown State School. The Carnegie theatre was, in the 1930s, a popular cinema, but has since been converted into offices.

Train network

Caulfield railway station originally opened on 7 May 1879.

Glenhuntly railway station opened on 19 December 1881 as Glen Huntly Road. It was later renamed to Glen Huntly in 1882 before being renamed again to Glenhuntly in 1937.

Ormond railway station opened on 19 December 1881 as North Road. It was later renamed to Ormond in 1897.

Carnegie railway station opened on 14 May 1879 as Rosstown. It was later renamed to Carnegie in 1909.

Monash University, Caulfield Campus
Monash University, Caulfield campus was founded as the Caulfield Technical School in 1922. A Junior Technical High School was added in the 1950s, with the Technical School becoming a Senior Technical High School. They separated in 1958 with the junior school absorbed by other technical schools in the area and the senior school became Caulfield Technical College. In the 1970s it became the Caulfield Institute of Technology. In 1982 the Caulfield Institute of Technology amalgamated with the State College of Victoria at Frankston to form the Chisholm Institute of Technology. This Institution merged with Monash University in 1990 and became Monash University, Caulfield campus.

Merger

In 1994 the local government structure was radically altered. The City of Glen Eira was formed from the City of Caulfield and the northern part of the City of Moorabbin. In March 1997 Glen Eira's first Council was elected by residents and ratepayers.

Sacking of Council - 2004

In September 2004, the then Minister for Local Government, Candy Broad, was asked to appoint an inspector by the Glen Eira City Council to investigate and report on matters arising out of an internal audit of councillors' expenses. In July 2005, the Inspector of Municipal Administration, Merv Whelan, forwarded a report to the Minister. The key findings portrayed a complete breakdown of communication and behavioural standards within the elected council, although Whelan found the council was well-managed and in a sound financial position because of its CEO and administration. A report in The Age newspaper alleged that several councillors had used their phone entitlements for non-council purposes.

On 11 August 2005, the then Minister sacked the council, and appointed John Lester, the former Chief Commissioner of Darebin City Council and former chair of the Victorian Grants Commission, as Administrator. An election for a new council was held on 26 November 2005 with redrawn ward boundaries. Only one councillor from the previous council, Margaret Esakoff, was re-elected. Three other sacked councillors (Noel Erlich, Veronika Martens and Bob Bury) did run again but failed to get elected into council.

Carbon neutral
Controversially, in 2009 the City of Glen Eira was one of the few regions in the Melbourne metropolitan area to make the decision not to become carbon neutral, despite most LGA's in Melbourne converting to a cleaner energy contract.

Government

Federal Parliament

The Australian House of Representatives is elected from 150 single-member districts called Divisions. There are a number of divisions that are partly in the City of Glen Eira. The current sitting members for these seats are:
 Division of Goldstein - Ms Zoe Daniel MP, Independent
 Division of Higgins - Dr Michelle Ananda-Rajah MP, Australian Labor Party
 Division of Hotham - Ms Clare O'Neil MP, Australian Labor Party
 Division of Macnamara - Mr Josh Burns MP, Australian Labor Party

Victorian State Parliament

The Legislative Assembly, or lower house, is one of the two chambers of the parliament of Victoria. The Assembly has 88 members, each elected from a single-member electorate or District. The Districts which fall in Glen Eira, the current sitting member, their political party and electoral address are as follows:
 Bentleigh District - Nick Staikos MP, Australian Labor Party
 Caulfield District - David Southwick MP, Liberal Party of Australia
 Oakleigh District - Steve Dimopoulos MP, Australian Labor Party

State Legislative Council - Southern Metropolitan Region
The City of Glen Eira falls within the Southern Metropolitan Region for the Victorian Legislative Council. These are the members representing that region:
 David Davis MLC (Liberal Party)
 Nina Taylor MLC (Labor Party)
 Georgie Crozier MLC (Liberal Party)
 Clifford Hayes MLC (Sustainable Australia)
 Enver Erdogan MLC (Labor Party)

Public transport

Glen Eira is well-served by an efficient network of public transport in a mix of trams, trains and buses.

Train lines and stations

Glen Eira is served by 3 train lines. These are the:
 Frankston Line
 Pakenham/Cranbourne Lines
 Sandringham Line

The Frankston Line is served by: Caulfield Railway Station (Zone 1), Glenhuntly Railway Station (Zone 1), Ormond Railway Station (Zone 1 & 2), McKinnon Railway Station (Zone 1 & 2), Bentleigh Railway Station (Zone 1 & 2) and then by Patterson Railway Station (Zone 2).

The Pakenham/Cranbourne Lines are both served by: Caulfield Railway Station (Zone 1), Carnegie Railway Station (Zone 1) and then by Murrumbeena Railway Station (Zone 1).

The Sandringham Line is served by: Elsternwick Railway Station (Zone 1).

Tram routes
Route 3 - East Malvern to Melbourne University which travels along Waverley Rd, Balaclava Rd, Carlisle St before proceeding along St Kilda Rd into the Central Business District
Route 16 - Kew to St Kilda and Melbourne University which travels along Glenferrie Rd, Hawthorn Rd and Balaclava Rd, Carlisle St, The Esplanade, Fitzroy St before proceeding along St Kilda Rd into the Central Business District
Route 64 - East Brighton to Melbourne University which runs along Hawthorn Rd and Dandenong Rd, before proceeding along St Kilda Rd into the Central Business District
Route 67 - Carnegie to Melbourne University which runs along Glen Huntly Rd and Brighton Rd, before proceeding along St Kilda Rd into the Central Business District

Schools in the City of Glen Eira

Government

East Bentleigh Primary School
Tucker Road Bentleigh Primary School
 Bentleigh Secondary College
St Peters Primary School
Coatesville Primary School
 Bentleigh West Primary School
Valkstone Primary School
 Glen Eira College
Caulfield South Primary School
Caulfield Primary School
Caulfield Park Community Secondary School
Caulfield Junior College
Glen Huntly Primary School
Carnegie Primary School
Ripponlea Primary School
 McKinnon Secondary College
McKinnon Primary School
Murrembeena Primary School
Ormond Primary School

Private

Adass Israel School
Beth Rivkah College
 Caulfield Grammar Senior School
Katandra School
 Kilvington Grammar School
 Leibler Yavneh College
 Melbourne Grammar School - Grimwade House
 Mount Scopus Memorial College - St Kilda East Campus
Our Lady of Sacred Heart College
 Wesley College - Elsternwick Campus
St. Aloysius Catholic Primary School
St. Anthony's Catholic Primary School
St. Bede's Bentleigh East Catholic College
St. Joseph's School
St. Kevin's Catholic Primary School
St. Patrick's Catholic Primary School
St. Paul's Catholic Primary School
 Shelford Girls' Grammar
Sholem Aleichem College
 Yeshivah College

Libraries and information
The city is served by free council run libraries. Library membership is free.

Council public library branches
Bentleigh - 161 Jasper Road, Bentleigh
Carnegie - a large suburban library and civic centre, which was built in 2005 - 7 Shepparson Avenue, Carnegie
Caulfield - at the City Hall, Corner Glen Eira and Hawthorn Roads, Caulfield
Elsternwick - 4 Staniland Grove, Elsternwick

Private libraries open to the public
Kadimah Jewish Cultural Centre and National Library - 7 Selwyn St, Elsternwick
Makor Jewish Community Library- 306 Hawthorn Rd, Caulfield

Sister cities
 Ōgaki, Gifu Prefecture, Japan

Notes

References

External links 
 
 Glen Eira City Council
 Glen Eira City Council Election Results
Metlink local public transport map
Link to Land Victoria interactive maps

Local government areas of Melbourne
Greater Melbourne (region)
 
Jews and Judaism in Melbourne